The 1987–88 Temple Owls men's basketball team represented Temple University as a member of the Atlantic 10 Conference during the 1987–88 NCAA Division I men's basketball season.

Roster

Derrick Brantley (1.9 ppg)
Duane Causwell (2.0 ppg)
Jerome Dowdell (1.5 ppg)
G Howard Evans (C) (Sr, 11.1 ppg), All A-10 (1st team)
Shawn Johnson (1.8 ppg)
Tom Katsikis (1.9 ppg)
G Mark Macon (Fr, 20.6 ppg), AP All-American (2nd team)
F Darrin Pearsall (Jr, 1.5 ppg)
F Tim Perry (Sr, 14.5 ppg), A-10 Player of Year
Ernest Pollard (1.3 ppg)
Shoun Randolph (1.0 ppg)
C Ramon Rivas (Sr, 6.9 ppg)
F Mike Vreeswyk (C) (Jr, 16.7 ppg) All A-10 (2nd team)

Schedule

|-
!colspan=12 style=| Regular Season

|-
!colspan=12 style=| Atlantic 10 Tournament

|-
!colspan=12 style=| NCAA Tournament

Rankings

Awards and honors
Tim Perry – Atlantic 10 Player of the Year, First-team All-Atlantic 10
Mark Macon – Consensus Second-team All-American, First-team All-Atlantic 10
Howard Evans – First-team All-Atlantic 10
John Chaney – AP Coach of the Year, NABC Coach of the Year, UPI Coach of the Year, USBWA National Coach of the Year, Atlantic 10 Coach of the Year

Team Players in the 1988 NBA draft

References

Temple Owls men's basketball seasons
Temple
Temple
Temple
Temple